Geoff Ward (born 8 April 1946) is a former  Australian rules footballer who played with St Kilda in the Victorian Football League (VFL). His father, Eric Ward, also played in the VFL.

Notes

External links 

Living people
1946 births
Australian rules footballers from Victoria (Australia)
St Kilda Football Club players
Caulfield Grammarians Football Club players